Concorde is a supersonic aircraft.

Concorde may also refer to:
 Concorde (pear), a cultivar of the European Pear

Transport
 Chrysler Concorde, an automobile model
 HMS Concorde, originally a French naval frigate, captured by the British Royal Navy in 1783
 La Concorde de Nantes, flagship of the pirate Blackbeard

Places and buildings
 Concorde (Paris Métro), a railway station named after the nearby Place de la Concorde
 Concorde De Luxe Resort, a hotel in Antalya, Turkey
 Hôtel Le Concorde, Québec
 Lycée français "Le Concorde"
 Le Concorde Tower, Huai Khwang District, Bangkok
 Swissôtel Le Concorde, Swissôtel in the Le Concorde Tower, Bangkok

Music
 Concorde (album), a 1955 album by the Modern Jazz Quartet
 Concorde, short for Concorde Contemporary Music Ensemble
 Le Concorde (band), American indie pop band
 "La Concorde", the national anthem of Gabon
 "Concorde", a song from Black Country, New Road's album Ants from Up There

Other
 Concorde TSP Solver, a piece of software
 The Concorde ... Airport '79, a 1979 film

See also
 Concord (disambiguation)
 Concorde Agreement
 Concordia (disambiguation)